Calvin Leavelle Dorsett (June 10, 1913 – October 22, 1970), nicknamed "Preacher", was an American professional baseball player. He served in the United States Marine Corps during World War II in the Pacific Theater of Operations, and missed the 1942–1945 baseball seasons.

In 13⅔ innings pitched, he allowed 25 hits, 13 bases on balls and 18 earned runs. He struck out six.

References

External links

1913 births
1970 deaths
United States Marine Corps personnel of World War II
Baseball players from Texas
Cleveland Indians players
Fort Worth Cats players
Lake Charles Skippers players
Major League Baseball pitchers
Nashville Vols players
Oklahoma City Indians players
Wilkes-Barre Barons (baseball) players
People from Hunt County, Texas